Ryan Andrew Ludwick (born July 13, 1978) is an American former professional baseball outfielder. He has played in Major League Baseball (MLB) for the Texas Rangers, Cleveland Indians, St. Louis Cardinals, San Diego Padres, Pittsburgh Pirates, and Cincinnati Reds. His brother Eric also played four MLB seasons as a pitcher.

Playing career

High school, college, and minor leagues
Ludwick attended Durango High School in Las Vegas, Nevada.

Ludwick then enrolled at the University of Nevada, Las Vegas (UNLV), and played for the UNLV Rebels baseball team for three seasons. Ludwick had a .363 career batting average at UNLV.

Ludwick was chosen in the second-round (60th overall) of the 1999 Major League Baseball draft by the Oakland Athletics. He was traded to the Texas Rangers before the  season, along with Gerald Laird, Jason Hart, and Mario Ramos, for first baseman Carlos Peña and pitcher Mike Venafro.

Texas Rangers, Cleveland Indians, back to minors
Ludwick batted right-handed and threw with his left hand. In the entire history of Major League Baseball through the 2008 season, and including the National Association of 1871-75 (not currently counted as a major league by MLB), only 57 players who played at least half their games at a position other than pitcher batted right and threw left.

In , Ludwick was traded by the Rangers to the Cleveland Indians for pitcher Ricardo Rodríguez and outfielder Shane Spencer. He was designated for assignment and sent to Triple-A in June 2005.

Toledo Mud Hens
Ludwick spent the  season playing for the Toledo Mud Hens, the Triple-A affiliate of the Detroit Tigers, and was named to the International League team for the 2006 Triple-A All-Star Game. Ludwick also help the Mud Hens win the Governors' Cup in 2006. Ludwick enjoyed great success in the Detroit organization, but due to a surplus of outfielders, Detroit did not offer Ludwick a new contract.

St. Louis Cardinals: All-Star
In , Ludwick was invited to spring training by the Cardinals and started in Triple-A Memphis. On May 6, Ludwick was promoted to the Cardinals after Preston Wilson went on the DL. In the 29 games preceding Ludwick's promotion, he hit .340 with 0 home runs but had 50 RBI at Memphis.

His fast start in  earned him an everyday player role. Ludwick was named to his first All-Star game on July 6 at Yankee Stadium in New York City. He won the National League Player of the Week Award for July 27-August 2. On August 14, Ludwick hit his 29th home run of the 2008 season; this broke the record for the most home runs in a season by a player who throws left-handed yet bats right-handed previously held by Rickey Henderson.

Ludwick would go on to win a Silver Slugger Award at the end of the 2008 season for his offensive performance along with fellow outfielders Matt Holliday and Ryan Braun. That year, Ludwick hit 37 home runs, 40 doubles, 113 RBIs, 3 triples and a solid .299 batting average.

After his breakout season of 2008, Ludwick started out  with a solid April, posting similar figures to his 2008 season by hitting .297 with five home runs, and 19 RBIs. He was then slowed by a strained right hamstring which placed him on the DL for 15 games.  After returning from his injury, Ludwick struggled with a .200 average during the month of June.  He had a productive July, hitting .340, with six home runs and a league-leading 28 RBIs, landing him NL Player of the Month honors. This gave the Cardinals 3 out of the last 4 NL Player of the Month awards, coupled with Albert Pujols's awards in April and June. At the end of the 2009 season Ludwick finished batting .265 with 22 home runs and 97 RBIs. Ludwick was primarily a right fielder, but also got playing time in left field and occasionally in center field.

During the 2010 offseason, Ludwick and the Cardinals were able to avoid arbitration, reaching an agreement on a one-year contract worth $5.45 million for 2010. Through mid-June, he batted .451 with runners in scoring position, second-best among all MLB players. Additionally, he batted .476 with 11 RBIs with runners in scoring position and two out. His strong performance with runners in scoring position lead to him being placed in the cleanup role on June 14 against the Seattle Mariners. The move paid off as he hit a 3-run home run in his first at bat, and went 2-for-4 in the game.

San Diego Padres

Ludwick was traded to the San Diego Padres in a three team deal on July 31, 2010, which sent starting pitcher Jake Westbrook and minor leaguer Nick Greenwood to the Cardinals and Corey Kluber to the Indians. Upon his first at-bat back in St. Louis, he received a standing ovation from the St. Louis crowd, and Ludwick tipped his cap to the crowd in return.

His stats took a hit in 2011 due to lack of production at the Padres home field, Petco Park. At the end of his tenure as a Padre, Ludwick was hitting .238 with 11 home runs and 64 runs batted in and 42 runs scored. He accounted for 25.3 percent of the Padres' runs. By comparison, Adrián González accounted for 23.6 percent of the Padres' runs in 2010.

Pittsburgh Pirates
In the final hour of the 2011 MLB non-waiver trading deadline on July 31, San Diego traded Ludwick to the Pittsburgh Pirates for a player to be named later.

Cincinnati Reds
On January 16, 2012 Ludwick agreed to terms with the Cincinnati Reds on a one-year contract worth $2.5M with an option for a second year in 2013. After initially splitting the left field duties with Chris Heisey, Ludwick eventually got most of the starts, often batting cleanup in the lineup as a right-handed hitter between lefties Joey Votto and Jay Bruce. In 125 games, he hit .275/.346/.531 with 26 home runs and 80 RBI. Ludwick started all 5 postseason games in the NLDS against the Giants, hitting .333 with 3 home runs and 4 RBI.

He declined his option on October 31, and became a free agent. He re-signed with the Reds to a two-year, $15 million deal with a mutual option for 2015 on December 10, 2012.

On Opening Day 2013, Ludwick tore cartilage in his right shoulder as well as dislocating it, requiring surgery. Ludwick was placed on the 60-day disabled list, and returned to the Reds on August 12. In 38 games, he hit .240/.293/.326 with 2 home runs and 12 RBI. In the Wild Card game against the Pirates, Ludwick went 3–4 with 2 doubles in the loss.

Second stint with Rangers
Ludwick signed a minor league deal with the Texas Rangers on February 4, 2015. On March 29, 2015, Ludwick was released by the Rangers.

On January 21, 2016, Ludwick announced his retirement.

Personal life
Ludwick and his wife, Joanie, reside in Georgetown, Texas, and have one son, Stetson Tyler. Ludwick has stated that he chose his son's name due to his affinity for Stetson hats.

References

External links

Ludwick player profile page at stlcardinals.scout.com

1978 births
Living people
Texas Rangers players
Cleveland Indians players
St. Louis Cardinals players
San Diego Padres players
Pittsburgh Pirates players
Cincinnati Reds players
UNLV Rebels baseball players
Akron Aeros players
Buffalo Bisons (minor league) players
Indianapolis Indians players
Memphis Redbirds players
Midland RockHounds players
Modesto A's players
Oklahoma RedHawks players
Sacramento River Cats players
Toledo Mud Hens players
Dayton Dragons players
Louisville Bats players
National League All-Stars
Major League Baseball outfielders
Baseball players from Florida
People from Satellite Beach, Florida
Silver Slugger Award winners
People from Georgetown, Texas
Anchorage Glacier Pilots players